The Empress's Favourite is a 1936 German historical comedy film directed by Werner Hochbaum and starring Olga Chekhova, Anton Pointner and Heinz von Cleve. It was shot at the Johannisthal Studios in Berlin. The film's sets were designed by Emil Hasler and Arthur Schwarz. The film is set in Russia during the reign of Empress Elizabeth.

Main cast
 Olga Chekhova as Elisabeth Kaiserin von Russland
 Anton Pointner as Fürst Ivan Potozky
 Heinz von Cleve as Prinz von Gottorp Vetter der Zarin
 Carl Esmond as Fähnrich Alexander Tomsky
 Walter Steinbeck as Graf Kurganoff
 Trude Marlen as Irina, seine Tochter, Hofdame
 Ilse Trautschold as Sophie ihr Kammermädchen
 Peter Erkelenz as Oberst Runitsch
 Erik Ode as Fähnrich Alexander Platow
 Adele Sandrock as Fürstin Dolgorucky
 Hans Adalbert Schlettow as Baron Axhausen
 Ada Tschechowa as Hofdame Romoff
 Edith Meinhard as Hofdame Wolkow
 Willy Kaiser-Heyl as Zeremonienmeister
 Wolf Harro as Fähnrich Alexander Schuwaloff
 Kurt Hinz as Fähnrich Alexander Repnin
 Carl Walther Meyer as Fähnrich Alexander Bonin

References

Bibliography 
 
 Klaus, Ulrich J. Deutsche Tonfilme: Jahrgang 1936. Klaus-Archiv, 1988.

External links 
 

1936 films
1930s historical comedy films
Films of Nazi Germany
German historical comedy films
1930s German-language films
Films directed by Werner Hochbaum
Films set in Russia
Films set in the 18th century
German black-and-white films
1936 comedy films
1930s German films
Films shot at Johannisthal Studios